Roopali Hardin Desai (born 1978) is a Canadian-American lawyer and jurist from Arizona who serves as a United States circuit judge of the United States Court of Appeals for the Ninth Circuit.

Education 

Desai was born in 1978 in Toronto, Canada. Desai's parents were born in India. She attended the University of Arizona, graduating in 2000 with a Bachelor of Arts. She worked as an outreach coordinator at a children's advocacy center and earned a Master of Public Health from Arizona in 2001. From 2001 to 2002, Desai was director of residential services at a domestic violence shelter. She then attended Arizona's James E. Rogers College of Law, graduating in 2005 with a Juris Doctor. Desai served as the legal counsel and campaign attorney  for senator Kyrsten Sinema.

Career 

After graduating from law school, Desai was a law clerk to Chief Judge Mary M. Schroeder of the U.S. Court of Appeals for the Ninth Circuit from 2005 to 2006. From 2006 to 2007, she was an associate at Lewis & Roca in Phoenix, Arizona. In 2007, Desai joined the Phoenix law firm Coppersmith Brockelman as an associate, becoming a partner in 2013. In naming her one of the publication's 2022 "Women of the Year", USA Today called her "a hero of Democratic legal causes," noting her work to launch a recreational marijuana program in Arizona, her lawsuits fighting false claims about the 2020 United States presidential election, and her work to overturn a ban on mask mandates. Desai taught a course titled "Government Liability" during the Spring 2022 term at James E. Rogers College of Law at the University of Arizona.

Notable cases 

In 2012, Desai was co-counsel for plaintiff Lois Jean McDermott. The case concerned a challenge to the nomination of Lois Jean McDermott, a Democratic candidate for the Arizona House of Representatives in Legislative District 24. McDermott appealed from a superior court judgment striking her from the primary election ballot because she incorrectly identified her surname as “Cheuvront–McDermott” in her nomination paper.
In 2018, Desai was co-counsel for plaintiffs Matthew G. Madonna, Sandra L. Bahr, Animal Defense League of Arizona, Friends of ASBA, Inc., Arizona Advocacy Network, and Planned Parenthood of Arizona in an appeal involving a challenge to the constitutionality of recently passed legislation pertaining to the standard of review for voter initiative petitions. On April 13, 2017, the Arizona legislature passed the bill, HB 2244, which was signed by the governor the next day.

In 2020, Desai represented the Arizona Dispensaries Association in advising it on a legalization campaign.
Before the 2020 U.S. presidential election, Desai was co-counsel for the Arizona Democratic Party and other plaintiffs. The case challenged Arizona's law requiring early voters to have signed their ballots by 7:00 PM on Election Day in order to have their votes counted.
After the 2020 U.S. presidential election, Desai successfully represented the Arizona Secretary of State's office in several cases involving unsuccessful challenges to the state's results.

Federal judicial service 

On June 15, 2022, President Joe Biden nominated Desai to serve as a United States circuit judge of the United States Court of Appeals for the Ninth Circuit. President Biden nominated Desai to the seat vacated by Judge Andrew D. Hurwitz, who will assume senior status upon confirmation of a successor. On July 13, 2022, a hearing on her nomination was held before the Senate Judiciary Committee. On July 28, 2022, her nomination was reported out of committee by a voice vote, with Senators Mike Lee, Ted Cruz, Josh Hawley, and Marsha Blackburn voting “no”. On August 4, 2022, the United States Senate confirmed her nomination by a 67–29 vote, just 50 days after her initial nomination and the fastest of any Circuit Court nominee since the Bill Clinton Administration. She received her judicial commission on October 3, 2022. Desai became the first South Asian person to serve on the Ninth Circuit.

Memberships 

Desai is a member of the ACLU. Desai represented the American Civil Liberties Union (ACLU) of Arizona in a public records case to obtain documents evidencing the Department of Child Safety’s mishandling of child abuse and negligence cases.

Personal life

Desai is married to artist and Phoenix College professor Jay Hardin. The couple have three daughters.

See also 
 List of Asian American jurists

References

External links 

1978 births
Living people
21st-century American judges
21st-century American women lawyers
21st-century American lawyers
21st-century American women judges
American jurists of Indian descent
Arizona lawyers
Canadian emigrants to the United States
James E. Rogers College of Law alumni
Judges of the United States Court of Appeals for the Ninth Circuit
People from Toronto
United States court of appeals judges appointed by Joe Biden
University of Arizona alumni
University of Arizona faculty